is the 15th compilation album by Japanese entertainer Miho Nakayama. Released through King Records on July 7, 2010 to commemorate Nakayama's 25th anniversary, the album compiles 34 of her singles from 1985 to 1996.

The album peaked at No. 105 on Oricon's albums chart.

Track listing

Charts

References

External links
 
 

2010 compilation albums
Miho Nakayama compilation albums
Japanese-language compilation albums
King Records (Japan) compilation albums